Nikolai Vasilyevich Bobkov (born November 30, 1940 in Rastorguyevo) is a retired Soviet football player.

Honours
 Soviet Top League winner: 1963.
 Soviet Top League runner-up: 1962, 1967.
 Soviet Cup winner: 1987.

External links
  Profile

Soviet footballers
Russian footballers
FC Shinnik Yaroslavl players
FC Dynamo Moscow players
FC Dynamo Barnaul players
Soviet Top League players
1940 births
Living people
People from Vidnoye
Association football midfielders
Sportspeople from Moscow Oblast